Doug Adams is an American television producer for NBC Nightly News with Brian Williams.

He graduated from Bucknell University, in 1988.

Awards
 2004 Gerald Loeb Award for Television Short Form business journalism for "The Jobless Recovery"
 2006 Gerald Loeb Award for Television Deadline business journalism for "The Katrina Deadline"

 Edward R. Murrow Award
 2008 Emmy Award Breaking News Story Long Form, for NBC News Decision 2008 Election Night
RTNDF German Fellowship

References

External links

American television producers
Bucknell University alumni
Year of birth missing (living people)
Living people
Gerald Loeb Award winners for Television